Arkady Platonovich Skugarevsky (Russian, Аркадий Платонович Скугаревский, 17 January 1847 – ) was an Imperial Russian division and corps commander. He fought in World War I against the Ottoman Empire and the Empire of Japan. He was Chairman of the Committee on Education of the Troops from 1906 to 1909. He was a member of the military council from 1909 to 27 April 1912.

Awards 
Order of Saint Anna, 3rd class, 1874
Gold Sword for Bravery, 1878
Order of Saint Vladimir, 4th class, 1878
Order of Saint Stanislaus (House of Romanov), 2nd class, 1879
Order of Saint Vladimir, 3rd class, 1890
Order of Saint Stanislaus (House of Romanov), 1st class, 1893
Order of Saint Anna, 1st class, 1898
Order of Saint Vladimir, 2nd class, 1902
Order of the White Eagle (Russian Empire), 1909
Foreign:
House and Merit Order of Peter Frederick Louis, 1884
Order of the Red Eagle, 2nd class, 1888

Writings 
Practical notes on tactics//military collection, 1873, no. 2
Battlefields of war 1870//military collection, 1874, no. 5-6
War game. Collection of tasks for tactical exercises, St. Petersburg, 1874
About military history//military collection, 1875, no. 1
Guide to tactical exercises with the collection tasks, Spb., 1875
Battle of Nachod 27 June 1866,./by k. n. Duropom and n. Jengel'gardtom. — Spb.: typography in. Demakova, 1875
Collection of tasks for combat tactics officers and n. Jengel'gardtom. — Spb., 1880
Attack infantry: parsing of contentious issues. — Spb.: typography and Was Fjusno, 1888. -80 p., 1 l. heck.
From the beginning of the 1812 war to Smolensk: practical techniques for the study of military history. -Kazan: Tipo-lithography Imperial University, 1898. [2], VI, 171 pp., 14 l. cards.
Essays and notes. H 1–2. — Spb., 1913

Sources 
 Глиноецкий, Николай Павлович Исторический очерк Николаевской академии Генерального штаба. — СПб.: Типография штаба войск гвардии и Петербургского военного округа, 1882
 Лукомский, Александр Сергеевич Очерки из моей жизни. Воспоминания. — М.: Айрис-пресс, 2012. — 
 «Разведчик». No. 1145. 9 October 1912
 Список генералам по старшинству. Составлен по 1-е июня 1911 года.  — СПб.: Военная типография, 1911

External links 
 Скугаревский Аркадий Платонович

1847 births
20th-century deaths
Russian military personnel of the Russo-Turkish War (1877–1878)
Russian military personnel of the Russo-Japanese War
Recipients of the Order of St. Anna, 3rd class
Recipients of the Gold Sword for Bravery
Recipients of the Order of St. Vladimir, 4th class
Recipients of the Order of Saint Stanislaus (Russian), 2nd class
Recipients of the Order of St. Vladimir, 3rd class
Recipients of the Order of Saint Stanislaus (Russian), 1st class
Recipients of the Order of St. Anna, 1st class
Recipients of the Order of St. Vladimir, 2nd class
Recipients of the Order of the White Eagle (Russia)